Isabella of Cyprus (died in 1264) was a Cypriotic princess. She was the regent of Kingdom of Jerusalem on behalf of her nephew King Hugh II in 1263-1264.

Family
Isabella was the daughter of Hugh I, king of Cyprus, and Alice of Champagne, regent of Jerusalem. She married Henry, the youngest son of Prince Bohemond IV of Antioch,  1233. The union was suggested by John of Ibelin, Isabella's granduncle and the leading nobleman of the Kingdom of Jerusalem, when he reconciled with Henry's father following the War of the Lombards. Isabella and Henry had two children, Hugh and Margaret. Along with her son she raised her nephew Hugh of Brienne, son of her deceased elder sister Maria.

Regency

Isabella's brother, King Henry I of Cyprus, died in 1253. He was succeeded by his minor son, King Hugh II. Hugh was then regarded as heir presumptive of King Conrad III of Jerusalem, who lived in Europe, and was entitled to rule the mainland kingdom too as regent. But since Hugh also required a regent on the account of his minority, it was his mother, Plaisance of Antioch, who governed. Queen Plaisance died in 1261. As the young king's only surviving aunt and closest relative, Isabella was entitled to be the next regent of Cyprus. She stood aside and allowed her son, Hugh of Antioch, to take up the regency. Hugh of Brienne, though son of the elder aunt, did not counter his claim. In 1264 he said the reason was his respect for his aunt who raised him.

The right to exercise regency of Jerusalem on behalf of the minor regent remained unclaimed by his family until 1263. Isabella stepped forward only after the Mamluk ruler of Egypt, Baibars, attacked Acre, the seat of the royal government. She then came to Acre with her husband, Henry. The law stated that the claimant to bailliage had to bring their ward when appearing before the High Court of Jerusalem. Since Isabella failed to do so, the High Court restricted her rule and refused to do homage and fealty to her. She then returned to Cyprus, leaving Henry to act on her behalf. She died in 1264, likely in the latter half of the year.

References

Sources
 
 
 

13th-century births
1264 deaths
13th-century people of the Kingdom of Jerusalem
13th-century women rulers
13th-century viceregal rulers
People of the Kingdom of Cyprus
Women of the Crusader states
Regents of Jerusalem
Year of birth uncertain
Daughters of kings